This is a list of petroglyphs in the United States.

States

Alaska
Petroglyph Beach State Historic Park

Arizona
Black Mountain (Pima County, Arizona)
Cocoraque Butte Archaeological District
Deer Valley Petroglyph Preserve
Honanki
Huerfano Butte (Arizona)
Keyhole Sink
Newspaper Rock Petroglyphs Archeological District
Northern Avenue Petroglyph Site
Painted Rock Petroglyph Site
Palatki Heritage Site
Petrified Forest National Park
Saguaro National Park
Tumamoc Hill
Tutuveni
V Bar V Heritage Site
White Tank Mountain Regional Park

California
Aiken's Wash
Barker Dam (California)
Big and Little Petroglyph Canyons
Black Mountain Rock Art District
Chalfant Petroglyph Site
Chumash Indian Museum
Coso Rock Art District
Hemet Maze Stone
Meadow Lake Petroglyphs
Painted Rock (San Luis Obispo County, California)
Petroglyph Point Archeological Site
Ring Mountain (California)
Yellow Jacket Petroglyphs

Florida

 Crystal River Archaeological State Park

Georgia
Track Rock

Illinois
Marshall Site (Chillicothe, Illinois)
Millstone Bluff
Piney Creek Ravine State Natural Area
Piney Creek Site
Piney Creek South Site
Piney Creek West Site
Tegtmeyer Site

Kentucky
Indian Head Rock
Jeffry Cliff Petroglyphs (15HA114)
Red Bird River Petroglyphs

Massachusetts
Dighton Rock

Michigan
Sanilac Petroglyphs Historic State Park

Minnesota
American Indian Rock Art in Minnesota MPS
Hegman Lake Pictograph
Jeffers Petroglyphs
Pipestone National Monument

Missouri
Holliday Petroglyphs
Thousand Hills State Park
Washington State Park

Maine
Maine Archaeological Survey site 21.26

Montana
Deer Medicine Rocks
Petroglyph Canyon
Pictograph Cave (Billings, Montana)

Nebraska

 Indian Cave State Park

Nevada
Brownstone Canyon Archaeological District
Grapevine Canyon Petroglyphs
Hidden Cave
Sloan Canyon National Conservation Area
Tim Springs Petroglyphs
Valley of Fire State Park
Winnemucca Lake

New Mexico
Crow Canyon Archaeological District
El Morro National Monument
Petroglyph National Monument
Rio Grande Gorge
Three Rivers Petroglyph Site

North Carolina
Judaculla Rock

North Dakota
Medicine Rock State Historic Site
Writing Rock State Historical Site

Ohio
Barnesville Petroglyph
Independence Slab
Inscription Rock (Kelleys Island, Ohio)
Leo Petroglyph
Turkey Foot Rock

Oregon
Abert Lake Petroglyphs
East Lake Abert Archeological District
Greaser Petroglyph Site
Picture Rock Pass Petroglyphs Site

Pennsylvania
Big and Little Indian Rock Petroglyphs
Francis Farm Petroglyphs
Indian God Rock
Sugar Grove Petroglyphs

South Carolina
South Carolina Petroglyph Site

Tennessee
Dunbar Cave State Park
Harpeth River State Park

Utah
Barrier Canyon Style
Buckhorn Draw Pictograph Panel
Courthouse Wash Pictographs
Horseshoe Canyon (Emery and Wayne counties, Utah)
Millsite Rock Art
Newspaper Rock State Historic Monument
Ninemile Canyon (Utah)
Observer Panel
Quail rock art panel
Rochester Rock Art Panel
White Canyon (San Juan County, Utah)

Vermont
Bellows Falls Petroglyph Site

Washington
Duwamish Head petroglyphs
Elliot Bay Petroglyphs
Ginkgo Petrified Forest State Park
Haleets
Lake Lenore Caves State Park
Yakima Indian Painted Rocks

West Virginia
Hamilton Farm Petroglyphs
Indian Cave Petroglyphs (West Virginia)
Wildcat Branch Petroglyphs

Wisconsin
Roche-a-Cri Petroglyphs

Wyoming
Arch Creek Petroglyphs
Legend Rock

Territories
Cueva Lucero, Puerto Rico
Reef Bay Trail petroglyphs, U.S. Virgin Islands

References

Petroglyphs